The Second Coming Tour is the seventh concert tour by American rock band, Faith No More. The tour supported their sixth greatest hits album, The Very Best Definitive Ultimate Greatest Hits Collection (2009). The tour primarily visited Europe with additional shows in Asia, Australasia and the Americas. Beginning in June 2009, the tour played over fifty shows, with a majority being an appearance at a music festival. It marks the band's first tour after over a decade hiatus.

Background

The band garnered media attention, when talks of a tour in the United Kingdom began to circulate in November 2008. These rumors were later dismissed by bassist Billy Gould. He stated:
"If anything like this were to happen, it would have to come from the band, and I haven't spoken with any of them in over a year. So as far as I know, there isn't anything to talk about, and I'm pretty sure that if you were to contact Patton, he would tell you the same thing."

On February 24, 2009, the band announced they were reforming with the same lineup during their 1997 album era. This announcement was following by a statement from the band's publicity hinted at a European tour. A month later, it was revealed the band was the headlining act for the Download Festival. News of other festival appearances later followed. The band posted pictures on their social media for their rehearsals for the tour. With more shows in Europe revealed, many fans wondered about shows in North America. Gould mentioned the thought of touring the US was "not out of the question" but chances were slim, as there was heavy demand elsewhere.

The tour officially ended in March 2010. However, the band continued to tour throughout the year and into 2012 with several one-off concerts and festival shows in the United States and Europe.

Opening acts

Eagles of Death Metal 
Selfish Cunt 
Farmers Market 
Zu 
Harmful 
CMX 
Waltari 
Kid606 
Kurban 
Firewater 
Adebisi Shank 
Emergency Blanket 
Lerdo 
Sepultura  
Fiskales Ad-Hok 
Pato Machete 
Clondementto 
Neil Hamburger

Setlist
The following setlist was obtained from the concert held on June 16, 2009; at the Kindl-Bühne Wuhlheide in Berlin, Germany. It does not represent all concerts for the duration of the tour.
"Reunited"
"The Real Thing"
"From Out of Nowhere"
"Land of Sunshine"
"Caffeine"
"Evidence"
"Chinese Arithmetic" 
"Surprise! You're Dead!"
"Easy"
"Cuckoo for Caca"
"Ashes to Ashes"
"Midlife Crisis"
"Introduce Yourself"
"The Gentle Art of Making Enemies"
"I Started a Joke"
"King for a Day"
"Be Aggressive"
"Epic"
"Mark Bowen"
Encore
"Stripsearch"
"We Care a Lot"
"Pristina"

Tour dates

Festivals and other miscellaneous performances

This concert was a part of the "Download Festival"
This concert was a part of the "Greenfield Festival"
This concert was a part of "Rock in Idro"
This concert was a part of the "Nova Rock Festival"
This concert was a part of the "Hurricane Festival"
This concert was a part of the "Southside Festival"
This concert was a part of the "Hove Festival"
This concert was a part of "Peace & Love"
This concert was a part of the "Roskilde Festival"
This concert was a part of the "Open'er Festival"
This concert was a part of "Ruisrock"
This concert was a part of "Sudoeste"
This concert was a part of the "Spirit of Burgas"
This concert was a part of the "Sziget Festival"
This concert was a part of "Pukkelpop"
This concert was a part of "Lowlands"
This concert was a part of the "Highfield-Festival"
This concert was a part of "Area4"
This concert was a part of "The Edge Festival"
This concert was a part of the "Reading Festival"
This concert was a part of "Rock en Seine"
This concert was a part of the "Leeds Festival"
This concert was a part of the "Pepsi Music Festival"
This concert was a part of the "Maquinaria Festival"
This concert was a part of "Soundwave"

Cancellations and rescheduled shows

Box office score data

External links
Faith No More Official site

References

Faith No More concert tours
2009 concert tours
2010 concert tours
Reunion concert tours